UBTZ (Ulaanbataar Railway Bureau,  Mongolyn tömöt zam) is Mongolia's national railway operator. It was established in 1949 as a joint venture between the Mongolian People’s Republic and the Soviet Union.

The company is jointly owned by the Mongolian and Russian government, with each having a 50% stake. Luvsandagva Purevbaatar is the company's chairman since December 2014.

The infrastructure of UBTZ consists of 1,815 km of broad gauge lines. UBTZ employs 14,046 people, owns 110 locomotives and about 3,000 wagons. The UBTZ network consists of two main lines:
 the Sukhbaatar-Zamyn-Üüd line, running north to south;
 the Ereentsav-Choibalsan line.

References

External links
 Official website

Railway companies of Mongolia
Government-owned companies of Mongolia
Government-owned companies of Russia